Shipbuilding in Limehouse started in the fourteenth century. Its name arose from the lime kilns established here around the same time. It became a centre for shipbuilding and related trades such as ropemaking, with some entrepreneurs shifting the focus of their activity through their careers.

John Graves established his shipyard at Limekiln Dock in 1633 and then expanded his holdings with Dundee Wharf.  By 1650 George Margetts developed a ropemaking yard including a ropehouse, storehouse and a ropewalk on land he leased from Graves.

References

Shipbuilding in London